Saint Cadocs/Penygarn is an electoral ward in the county borough of Torfaen in south east Wales.

Saint Cadocs is quite small and holds Saint Cadocs parish church in it. Penygarn is divided into housing estate areas and Old Penygarn, one of the richest places in Pontypool.  There are only about 15–20 houses in old Penygarn.

Penygarn is semi-rural and is close to American Gardens, Pontypool Park.

Bron Afon Housing are Refurbishing their stock of "Airey" type housing to a high degree

External links 
BBC Wales local links

Populated places in Torfaen